Stratford Municipal Airport  is located  northeast of the city of Stratford, Ontario, Canada. Its location identifier designation was changed from CNM4 to CYSA effective 20 September 2012.

The airport is classified as an airport of entry by Nav Canada and is staffed by the Canada Border Services Agency (CBSA) on a call-out basis from the Waterloo International Airport on weekdays and the John C. Munro Hamilton International Airport on weekends. CBSA officers at this airport can handle general aviation aircraft only, with no more than 15 passengers.

References

External links
Page about this airport on COPA's Places to Fly airport directory

Certified airports in Ontario
Buildings and structures in Stratford, Ontario
Transport in Stratford, Ontario